The Italian Contemporary Film Festival (ICFF) is a not-for-profit, publicly attended film festival in Toronto, Ontario, Canada, programming both films from Italy, and Canadian films about Italian-Canadian culture. Founded in 2012, ICFF has grown from a four-day, single-venue festival of 18 films, to a 10-day, nine-city festival of over 130 feature films, documentaries and short films.

The ICFF has a monthly program with screenings and events held in its main cities, a Youth Festival program and its main June Festival initiative.

Every year ICFF takes place during the month of June in celebration of Ontario’s Italian Heritage Month with screenings in the cities of Toronto, Vaughan, Vancouver, Hamilton, Markham, Niagara, Montreal, Ottawa and Quebec City. The ICFF festival screenings in Toronto are held at the TIFF Bell LightBox. The ICFF also runs special events and international programs throughout the year, which aim to involve different niche audiences.

Due to the COVID-19 pandemic in Canada, in 2020 the 9th edition of the ICFF took place online. In both 2020 and 2021, in light of the pandemic the ICFF and corporate sponsor Lavazza also organized the special Lavazza Drive-In Film Festival, a screening series of films presented at a drive-in theatre at Ontario Place; the Lavazza Festival included some Italian films in its program, but programmed a diversity of films representing a broad cross-section of Canadian and international multicultural films rather than being exclusively Italian-themed.

History

2012 – 1st Italian Contemporary Film Festival 

 Films screened: 16 films
 Shorts screened: N/A
 Notable films featured: What a Beautiful Day/Che bella giornata, To Rome with Love, The Vanishing of Pato/La scomparsa di Patò, Basilicata Coast to Coast
 Opening Film: Kryptonite!/La Kryptonite nella borsa, Directed by: Ivan Cotroneo, Italy
 Closing Film: A Flat for Three/Posti in piedi in paradiso, Directed by: Carlo Verdone, Italy
 Cities: Toronto, TIFF Bell Lightbox

2013 – 2nd Italian Contemporary Film Festival 

 Films screened: 34 films
 Shorts screened: 26 Shorts
 Notable films featured: Welcome Mr. President/Benvenuto Presidente!, Siberian Education/Educazione Siberiana, It Was The Son/ È stato il figlio, A Perfect Family/ Una famiglia perfetta, Viva L’Italia
 Opening Film: Welcome Mr. President/Benvenuto Presidente! Directed by: Riccardo Milani, Italy
 Closing Film: Come Undone/ Cosa voglio di più, Directed by: Silvio Soldini, Italy
 Cities: Toronto and Montreal

2014 – 3rd Italian Contemporary Film Festival 

 Films screened: 25 films
 Shorts screened: 37 Shorts
 Notable films featured: The Best Offer/La migliore offerta, Those Happy Years/Anni felici, Like the Wind/Come il vento, First Snowfall/La prima neve, Sotto una buona stella
 Opening Film: The Best Offer/La migliore offerta, Directed by: Giuseppe Tornatore, Italy
 Closing Film: Stay Away From Me/Stai lontana da me, Directed by: Alessio Maria Federici, Italy
 Cities: Toronto, Montreal, Quebec City

2015 – 4th Italian Contemporary Film Festival 

 Films screened: 28 films
 Shorts screened: 22 shorts
 Notable films featured: So Far So Good/Fino a qui tutto bene, I Can Quit Whenever I Want/Smetto quando voglio, The Legendary Giulia and Other Miracles/Noi e la Giulia, Leopardi/Il giovane favoloso
 Opening Film: L’Oriana, Directed by: Marco Turco, Italy
 Closing Film: Ever bene to the Moon?/Sei mai stata sulla luna, Directed by: Paolo Genovese, Italy
 Cities: Toronto, Montreal, Vaughan, Quebec City, Mississauga, Hamilton

2016 – 5th Italian Contemporary Film Festival 

 Films screened: 32 films
 Shorts screened: 21 shorts
 Notable films featured: Quo Vado?, The Stuff of Dreams/La stoffa dei sogni, First Light/La prima luce
 Opening Film: Quo Vado? Directed by: Gennaro Nunziante, Italy
 Closing Film: The Correspondence/ La corrispondenza, Directed by: Giuseppe Tornatore, Italy
 Cities: Toronto, Montreal, Vaughan, Quebec City, Hamilton, Niagara

2017 – 6th Italian Contemporary Film Festival 

 Films screened: 36 films
 Shorts screened: 25 shorts
 Notable films featured: Like Crazy/La pazza gioia, Flower/Fiore, Indivisible/Indivisibili, It’s the Law/L’Ora legale
 Opening Film:  Something New/Qualcosa di nuovo, Directed by: Cristina Comencini, Italy
 Closing Film: Like Crazy/La pazza gioia, Directed by: Paolo Virzì, Italy
 Cities: Toronto, Montreal, Vaughan, Quebec City, Hamilton, Vancouver

2018 – 7th Italian Contemporary Film Festival 

 Films screened: 46 films
 Shorts screened: 29 shorts
 Notable films featured: There's No Place Like Home/A Casa Tutti Bene, Love and Bullets/Ammore e malavita, Road To The Lemon Grove, The Last Prosecco/Finché c’è prosecco c’è speranza/, Tulipani: Love, Honor and a Bicycle
 Opening Film: Like a Cat on a Highway/Come un gatto in tangenziale, Directed by: Riccardo Milani, Italy
 Closing Film: Shape of Water, Directed by: Guillermo del Toro, Canada
 Cities: Toronto, Vaughan, Montreal, Quebec City, Ottawa, Vancouver, Hamilton, Niagara

2019 – 8th Italian Contemporary Film Festival 

 Films screened: 47 films
 Shorts screened: 47 shorts
 Notable films featured: I am Mia/Io Sono Mia, The First King: Birth of an Empire/Il Primo re, From the Vine, The King’s Musketeers/Moschettieri del re, Dogman
 Opening Film: Dolceroma, Directed by: Fabio Resinaro, Italy
 Closing Film: Greenbook, Directed by: Peter Farrelly, USA
 Cities: Toronto, Vaughan, Montreal, Quebec City, Ottawa, Vancouver, Hamilton

2020 – 9th Italian Contemporary Film Festival 
Postponed due the COVID-19 pandemic, the festival took place online from November 29 to December 8.

 Films screened: 18 films 
 Shorts screened: 28 shorts
 Notable films featured: Aspromonte: the Land of the Forgotten/ Aspromonte - la terra degli ultimi, Tolo Tolo, Fellinopolis, Hidden Away/Volevo nascondermi, All My Crazy Love/Volare
 Opening Film: Fellinopolis, Directed by: Silvia Giulietti, Italy
 Cities: Canada-wide online program

2021 – 10th Italian Contemporary Film Festival 
The festival took place both with drive-in screenings and open-air events from June 19 to August 2.

 Films screened: 40 films
 Shorts screened: 28 shorts
 Notable films featured: Luca, The Best Years/Gli anni più belli, The Comebak Trail, My Boyfriend's Meds, Septet: The Story of Hong Kong, Out of My League/Sul più bello, Bye Bye Morons. 
 Opening Film: The Comeback Trail, Directed by: George Gallo, USA
 Cities: Toronto, Montreal, and online Canada-wide on the ICFF digital platform

Special Events 
Part of ICFF’s mandate is to celebrate Italian culture in all its aspects and each year ICFF organizes different events and initiatives to display renowned Italian traditions.

ICFF Industry Day 
Industry Day is an annual event which first launched in 2015. The event poses an opportunity for filmmakers and industry professionals to network and share ideas, which in past editions has led to collaborations and co-production projects. ICFF Industry Day discusses the opportunities and challenges faced by the industry, startups and talent development. The day-long program includes panel discussions and industry professionals who discuss their experiences working on Italian-Canadian productions and share ideas for the next phase of co-productions between the two countries.

Guest speakers in recent years included: Academy Award winning composer, Nicola Piovani, for Life is Beautiful and Oscar Award winning producer and screenwriter, Nick Vallelonga, for Green Book. Film institutions who participated in the event include: Telefilm Canada, Ontario Creates, Take 5 Productions, Rogers Communications, SIRT, Indigo Film and Istituto Luce Cinecittà.

ICFF Architettura & Design 
The annual event showcases the work and contributions from Italian architects and designers who have influenced this industry. The event includes a combination of film screenings and panel discussions where industry professionals share their outlook on new industry developments, challenges and upcoming opportunities.

ICFF Letteratura 
ICFF Letteratura is an event that hosts poets, novels and poem writers who are the centre of a film or an important part of the story. The event aims to underline and celebrate the importance of Italian-Canadian writers and poets in Canada, giving them a platform to share their works.

ICFF in the Vineyard 
This ICFF annual event brings together film, wine and food in partnership with Two Sisters Vineyards in Niagara-on-the-lake, Ontario. Its aim is to celebrate Italy’s gastronomic culture, flavours and food traditions through a film screening that accompanies the experience at the vineyard. The evening features Two Sisters Vineyards wines accompanied by Italian dishes.

ICFF Call the Shots 
Call The Shots is an annual event that celebrates and honours women’s achievements in thought, leadership, and action. Call the Shots: Female Power Through Film tackles various themes and subject matter from the perspective of women who have achieved great success and become experts in their respective fields. In every aspect, in every field, and in every sector - be it filmmaking, journalism, the arts or industrial entrepreneurship - our guests represent the Canadian and Italian-Canadian women making an impact on their community and society as a whole.

ICFF Care 
Every year ICFF focuses on a community building social justice event, discussing and supporting communities affected by unfortunate events. In 2018 the event was dedicated to support those affected by the earthquakes that ravaged Italy in 2017.

Apericena at ICFF 
Each year ICFF, in honour of TIFF, organizes a networking dinner-aperitivo night.

This is an event open to everyone in the industry and the Italian delegation at TIFF. Invitations are sent to celebrate Italian films in partnership with TIFF, as well as an early look at the next year's ICFF program.

ICFF Motori 
The event brings together all car enthusiasts from both Italian and Canadian backgrounds, who have an interest in learning more about the history, culture and manufacturing through films and documentaries. ICFF hosts discussion opportunities with film directors and actors as well as panels for further exploration of the theme.

ICFF Arte 
ICFF Arte is an annual initiative that showcases films and documentaries focused on some of the most influential Italian artists in modern and contemporary art.

ICFF Cucina 
Every year ICFF Cucina honours the Italian culinary traditions through a program that combines film and food. ICFF presents movies and panel discussions about the most classic and traditional dishes that characterize the cuisine "made in Italy”.

ICFF Cycling 
ICFF Cycling is an initiative that takes the audience on a tour which celebrates this very sport and the champions who made Italian cycling history.

ICFF Moda 
ICFF Moda is an event that encompasses three important elements of the Italian experience: food, film and fashion. This initiative features a fashion show inclusive of local and notable Italian brands and designers, accompanied by short films focused on Italian fashion.

ICFF Befana in Vaughan 
This event focuses on a longstanding tradition in Italian culture known as “befana”. The initiative takes place every year in Vaughan, where the day is filled with events and activities dedicated to children.

Opening Party 
The ICFF festival opens each year with an official ‘Opening Party’ for guests. The event signifies the start of the 10-day festival week that celebrates all things Italian.

Closing Gala 
The ICFF festival closes each year at the Ritz-Carlton Hotel with an official Closing Gala Award Ceremony. Guests attend for a sit-down dinner followed by presentations, performances and award hand-outs to the star guests in attendance.

ICFF Youth Film Festival 
ICFF Youth is the annual film programme of ICFF that promotes film as an art form using the platform of International Cinema, while providing students (ages 8 to 18) with exposure to a variety of cultures and languages.

The program includes feature films, documentaries, animations and shorts. It provides educators with an alternate teaching strategy that respects a variety of learning styles.

The mission of ICFF Youth is two-fold:

1.     To use cinema as a tool to enrich students’ analytical and critical skills while learning about key elements of the art of filmmaking.

2.     To give students the opportunity to develop their knowledge of International languages and culture while enjoying the best of contemporary International Cinema.

Eight to ten movies are selected each year for screenings set in Vaughan, Richmond Hill, North York and Toronto. The films are screened in their original language (Italian, French, Mandarin, Cantonese, Spanish and Portuguese) with English subtitles, and come with pedagogical material provided to all participating teachers. All suggested activities and strategies are based on the Ontario Curriculum which serves as a guide for all prepared educational material.

Awards

2012 – 1st Italian Contemporary Film Festival

2013 – 2nd Italian Contemporary Film Festival

2014 – 3rd Italian Contemporary Film Festival

2015 – 4th Italian Contemporary Film Festival

2016 – 5th Italian Contemporary Film Festival

2017 – 6th Italian Contemporary Film Festival

2018 – 7th Italian Contemporary Film Festival

2019 – 8th Italian Contemporary Film Festival

2020 – 9th Italian Contemporary Film Festival

2021 – 10th Italian Contemporary Film Festival

References 

Film festivals in Toronto
Film festivals established in 2012
Cinema of Italy
Italian-Canadian culture